Ian John Hopkinson (born 19 October 1950) is an English former footballer who played as a forward in the Football League for Barrow, Workington and Darlington, and in the Scottish League for Berwick Rangers. He began his career as an apprentice with Newcastle United, and also played non-league football for North Shields and Gateshead United.

References

1950 births
Living people
Footballers from Newcastle upon Tyne
English footballers
Association football forwards
Newcastle United F.C. players
Barrow A.F.C. players
Workington A.F.C. players
Berwick Rangers F.C. players
Darlington F.C. players
North Shields F.C. players
South Shields F.C. (1936) players
English Football League players
Scottish Football League players
Northern Premier League players